"I Am a Catalan" the name given to a short speech given by cellist and humanist Pau Casals in front of the General Assembly of the United Nations on the 24 October 1971. Casals was in front of the assembly to present the "Hymn of the United Nations" composed by himself and to receive the U.N. Peace Medal in recognition of his stance for peace, justice and freedom.  In his acceptance speech, in English, he praised Catalonia and the Peace and Truce of God meetings, which he refers to as "the first parliament":

After the speech Casals, 94 years old, performed one of his most popular pieces "El Cant dels Ocells".

The speech had a major impact on Catalan society living in the Francoist state. It became a popular motto within Catalan nationalist circles; Catalans saw their national identity and history recognized worldwide by one of their greatest citizens.

Casals received the Gold Medal of the Generalitat of Catalonia in 1979, 6 years after his death.

External links
UN Day Concert 1971 at United Nations UN Audiovisual Library
Original speech video at YouTube

History of the United Nations
Catalan nationalism
1971 speeches
1971 in Spain
Spain and the United Nations